Marcel Auguste Louis Samuel-Rousseau (né Rousseau; 18 August 1882 – 11 June 1955) was a French composer, organist, and opera director.

Biography
Born in Paris, he was the son of Samuel Rousseau and later changed his surname to Samuel-Rousseau to reflect this. He studied composition at the Paris Conservatoire and was awarded the Prix de Rome in 1905. He was the organist at Saint-Séverin from 1919 to 1922 and president of the Société des auteurs, compositeurs et éditeurs de musique (SACEM) from 1935 to 1953. For many years he was a professor of harmony at the Paris Conservatoire and artistic director of the Pathé opera company. From 1941 to 1944 he was director of the Opéra National de Paris.

As a composer, Samuel-Rousseau was highly influenced by the works of Franck and Fauré. He tended to be more conservative in style than many of contemporaries but he was a master at chromatic harmony and had a strong sense for the dramatic. His compositions include operas, ballets, orchestral and piano music and songs. His best works are his operas, which tend towards the exotic and are ambitious in scale. Two of his operas, Le Hulla (1920) and Kerkeb (1931), are based in the Orient; with the latter's title role a barber dancer in a harem. His opera Tarass Boulba (1919) is based on the legend of a Cossack warrior. He also wrote an opera based on the Arthurian legend Le Roi Arthur (1903).

He died in Paris in 1955, aged 72.

Sources
 Paul Griffiths, Richard Langham Smith, in The New Grove Dictionary of Opera, edited by Stanley Sadie (1992),  and

External links
 

1882 births
1955 deaths
20th-century classical composers
Conservatoire de Paris alumni
French classical composers
French male classical composers
French opera composers
French opera directors
Male opera composers
Musicians from Paris
Members of the Académie des beaux-arts
Prix de Rome for composition
20th-century French male musicians